The hymen is a fold of mucous membrane which surrounds or partially covers the external vaginal opening.

Hymen may also refer to:

People
 Frederic Hymen Cowen (1852–1935), British pianist, conductor and composer
 Hymen Lipman (19th century), American inventor
 Slymenstra Hymen (born 1966), female dancer and occasional vocalist of the heavy metal band Gwar

Other uses
 Hymen (god), the god of marriage ceremonies in Greek mythology
 Hymenoptera, an order of insects
 Hymen Records, an imprint of the record label Ant-Zen, distributed by IRIS

See also
 Hyman, a given name and surname
 Hymen o Hymenee an 1889 painting by Filipino painter Juan Luna

Masculine given names